Mazyr Raion, Mazyrski Raion is an administrative subdivision, a raion of Gomel Region, in Belarus.

 
Districts of Gomel Region